Trevor Wilmot (born October 30, 1972) is a former American football linebacker. He played for the Indianapolis Colts in 1995.

References

1972 births
Living people
American football linebackers
Indiana Hoosiers football players
Indianapolis Colts players
Amsterdam Admirals players